The Journal on Chain and Network Science is a peer-reviewed academic journal, which aims to promote theory and practice in the field of innovation in business chains and networks. It is published by Wageningen Academic Publishers.

External links 
 

Business and management journals
English-language journals